The Dockrell 37 is a British sailboat that was designed by Dockrell Yachts as a cruiser and first built in 1981.

Production
The design was built by Dockrell Yachts in the United Kingdom, a company started by the American John Dockrell. The design is now out of production.

Design
The Dockrell 37 is a recreational keelboat, built predominantly of glassfibre, with wood trim. It has a cutter rig, with aluminum spars and with the staysail utilizing a boom. The design features a spooned raked stem, a slightly reverse transom, a skeg-internally mounted rudder controlled by a tiller and a fixed stub keel with a retractable centreboard. It displaces .

The propeller is keel-mounted.

The design provides sleeping accommodation for up to seven people. There is a bow "V"-berth, two settee berths in the main cabin and an aft double berth in a small stateroom. The galley is located aft on the starboard side, behind the companionway steps and includes a two-burner propane-fired stove, an electric refrigerator and a double sink. The head is located on the port side, just aft of the bow cabin. The main cabin has teak and mahogany wooden trim. An alternate cabin arrangement relocates the galley to the main cabin area, oriented fore-and-aft.

Ventilation is provided by two hatches, one over the main cabin and one over the aft cabin. The blunt front of the coach house also has opening ports. During production several different port configurations were used.

The cockpit is relatively small, but is self-draining.

Operational history
In a review Richard Sherwood wrote, "this boat, built to Lloyds specifications, has the beam restricted to 10 feet for use in European canals or for overland transportation. She is light displacement, has a low wetted surface, and combines a fixed with a swing keel."

See also
List of sailing boat types

Similar sailboats
Alberg 37
Baltic 37
C&C 37
CS 36
Dickerson 37
Endeavour 37
Express 37
Hunter 36-2
Nor'Sea 37
Tayana 37

References

Keelboats
1980s sailboat type designs
Sailing yachts
Sailboat type designs by Dockrell Yachts
Sailboat types built by Dockrell Yachts